Alberto Carpinteri (born 23 December 1952) is an Italian professor and engineer.

Biography
Alberto Carpinteri is professor in science of construction at the Polytechnic University of Turin and was director of the Istituto Nazionale di Ricerca Metrologica (INRiM) in Turin.  He is a member of the New York Academy of Sciences.

He is mainly known for his contribution in the study of piezonuclear fission, which is the purported theory that "compressing solids can provoke nucleus-splitting reactions without emitting gamma-rays or producing nuclear waste".

In 2013 INRiM was set in temporary receivership and Carpinteri dismissed after the resignation of two-thirds of the board of directors in objection of Carpinteri's support in the purported theory of piezonuclear fission.

Prizes and honours
Odone Belluzzi Prize for Science of Constructions, University of Bologna (1976)  
Medal Robert L'Hermite, RILEM (1982)
NATO Senior Scholarship – Lehigh University, Pennsylvania (1982) – Northwestern University, Illinois (1985) 
Medal of Japan Society of Mechanical Engineers (1993) 
Honorary degree in Physics, Constantinian University, Rhode Island (1994) 
Honoris Causa Professor, Nanjing University, China (1996) 
Honoris Causa Professor, Albert Schweitzer University of Ginevra, Switzerland (2000)
Wessex Institute of Technology International Prize, Southampton, UK (2000)
Griffith Medal for Fractural Mechanics, ESIS (2008)

References

Living people
1932 births
Engineers from Bologna
20th-century Italian physicists
Academic staff of the Polytechnic University of Turin